Delias mysis, the Union Jack or red-banded Jezebel, is a butterfly in the family Pieridae. It is endemic to northern Australia, New Guinea and neighbouring islands. The common name is a reference to the flag of the British Empire. The butterfly was given this name, because the patterns and colours on the underside of the wings of the males resembles the flag.

The species has a wide variety in colours and patterns, hence a great deal of subspecies have been named.

The wingspan is 60–70 mm.

The larvae feed on mistletoe species, especially Dendrophthoe glabrescens.

External links
 Union Jack info
Delias at Markku Savela's Lepidoptera and Some Other Life Forms

mysis
Lepidoptera of New Guinea
Butterflies described in 1775
Taxa named by Johan Christian Fabricius
Butterflies of Oceania